Rikke Kornvig (born 1983) is a Danish mountain bike orienteer. She won a silver medal in the middle distance, and a gold medal with the Danish relay team at the 2010 World MTB Orienteering Championships in Montalegre.

References

External links
 

Danish orienteers
Female orienteers
Danish female cyclists
Mountain bike orienteers
Living people
Place of birth missing (living people)
1983 births
21st-century Danish women